The Vilcek Foundation raises awareness of immigrant contributions to the United States, and fosters appreciation of the arts and sciences. The foundation's flagship programs include the Vilcek Foundation Prizes, which recognize and support immigrant contributions to American arts, biomedical science, and society. The foundation is also the designated steward of the art collection assembled by founders Jan and Marica Vilcek, comprising holdings in American modernism, Native American pottery, pre Columbian objects, and contemporary art.

The Foundation was established in 2000 by Jan and Marica Vilcek, immigrants from the former Czechoslovakia. The mission of the Foundation was inspired by the couple's respective careers in biomedical science and art history, as well as their personal experiences and appreciation for the opportunities offered them as newcomers to the United States.

Prizes

Vilcek Prizes
The Vilcek Prizes are awarded to foreign-born individuals residing permanently in the United States, with a legacy of outstanding achievement in the arts and sciences. The Foundation awards two Vilcek Prizes annually, one in biomedical science and the other in the arts and humanities; the latter in a field designated annually by the Foundation, such as fine arts, architecture, music, filmmaking, culinary art, literature, dance, contemporary music, design, and fashion. Each prize consists of a $100,000 cash award and a commemorative sculpture designed by Austrian-born Stefan Sagmeister.

Vilcek Prize for Excellence
The Vilcek Prize for Excellence, introduced in 2019, recognizes immigrants whose contributions profoundly impact American society and world culture, or individuals who are champions for immigrant causes. The recipients receive a $100,000 cash award and a commemorative diploma designed by Jessica Walsh.

Vilcek Prizes for Creative Promise
The Vilcek Prizes for Creative Promise are awarded to foreign-born individuals who have demonstrated outstanding achievement during the early stages of their careers. Like the Vilcek Prize, the Vilcek Prizes for Creative Promise are awarded each year in the field of biomedical science and a selected art field. Creative Promise applicants are required to submit essays, personal statements, and examples of their work. To be eligible for the prize, applicants must have been born abroad, reside permanently in the United States, and be within the specified age limit. As of 2013, three prizes each will be awarded in biomedical science and a designated art field. Each recipient is awarded a $50,000 cash prize and a commemorative plaque.

Vilcek-Gold Award for Humanism in Healthcare
In 2019, the Vilcek Foundation partnered with the Arnold P. Gold Foundation to create a joint award, the Vilcek-Gold Award for Humanism in Healthcare. The award is bestowed to a foreign-born individual in the United States who has demonstrated an extraordinary impact on humanism in healthcare through their professional achievements.

The 2019 Vilcek-Gold Award for Humanism in Healthcare was given to Dr. Mona Hanna-Attisha for her advocacy and interventions in addressing the water crisis in Flint, Michigan. Dr. Vivek Murthy, 19th Surgeon General of the United States, is the recipient of the 2020 Vilcek-Gold Award for Humanism in Healthcare.

New American Perspectives

Since 2007, the Vilcek Foundation has been a sponsor of the New American Perspectives (formerly the "New American Filmmakers") program at the Hawaii International Film Festival (HIFF). Curated and presented in collaboration with HIFF, the program seeks out the most talented foreign-born filmmakers currently contributing to American cinema. The result is a diverse program that draws upon cinematic genres and traditions from around the world.

In 2019, the program was relaunched as the New American Perspectives program, to encompass sharing mixed media at the festival, including virtual reality programming.

Prize recipients

Vilcek Prizes

Vilcek Prizes for Excellence

Vilcek Prizes for Creative Promise

In 2013, the Vilcek Prizes for Creative Promise were changed from recognizing one winner and four finalists to recognizing three winners in each category.  The past finalists are listed below.

Vilcek-Gold Award for Humanism in Healthcare

Art collections

The Vilcek Foundation holds several art collections that are promised gifts from founders Jan and Marica Vilcek. These collections include the American Modernism Collection, which traces the development of artists such as Oscar Bluemner, Ralston Crawford, Stuart Davis, and Marsden Hartley, as well as the movement as a whole; the Native American Pottery Collection, which consists primarily of objects by Acoma, Hopi, Cochiti, Kewa, Tesuque, Zia, and Zuni potters, dating from the 19th and 20th centuries; and the Pre-Columbian Collection, which features objects from across the pre-Columbian world, with an emphasis on the art of Mesoamerica, and a Collection of Art by Immigrant Artists.

Events and exhibitions

In 2019, the Vilcek Foundation opened their new headquarters on Manhattan's Upper East Side, which includes two floors of gallery space. The gallery is the site of free, public exhibitions based on the Vilcek Foundation Art Collections. The Vilcek Foundation also partners with institutions throughout the United States and around the globe to develop and share exhibitions featuring work from the Vilcek Foundation Art Collections with the wider public.

The foundation's exhibitions are open to the public by appointment.

Current exhibitions

Nari Ward: Home of the Brave (2022-2023) 
In May 2022, the Vilcek Foundation opened an exhibition, Nari Ward: Home of the Brave, featuring sculptures and installations by Jamaican-born artist and Vilcek Prizewinner Nari Ward. The exhibition is on view by appointment in the Vilcek Foundation headquarters through May, 2023.

Grounded in Clay: The Spirit of Pueblo Pottery (2022-2025) 
In July 2022, the Vilcek Foundation supported the development and opening of the exhibition, Grounded in Clay: The Spirit of Pueblo Pottery at the Museum of Indian Arts and Culture in Santa Fe, New Mexico. The exhibition features works of Pueblo Pottery from the Vilcek Foundation Collection and from the collection of the Indian Arts Research Center at the School for Advanced Research. The exhibition was curated by a group of more than 60 artists, historians, and stewards of Native American art, the Pueblo Pottery Collective, and is accompanied by a catalog from Merrell Publishers.

Past exhibitions 
The Vilcek Foundation has hosted and supported the development of several exhibitions both on site at the Vilcek Foundation, and in partnership with museums and institutions around the globe.

Ralston Crawford: Air + Space + War (2021-2022) 
The Vilcek Foundation presented its second major exhibition featuring works by American Modernist Ralston Crawford, following Ralston Crawford: Adventurer in the Arts. Curated by Emily Schuchardt Navratil, this landmark exhibition collected an extensive group of drawings, paintings, and photographs that document the influence of Crawford’s experiences in the U.S. military on his life and work.

Ralston Crawford: Air + Space + War centers on commissions Crawford undertook at the Curtiss-Wright Aircraft Plant in Buffalo, New York, and his assignment to document nuclear weapons tests conducted by the U.S. Joint Army/Navy Task Force at Bikini Atoll for Fortune Magazine in 1946.

Ralston Crawford: Air + Space + War opened at the Brandywine River Museum of Art in June 2021, where it was on view through September 2021. The exhibition subsequently opened at the Dayton Art Institute in October 2021, where it was on view through January 2022.

Ralston Crawford: Torn Signs (2019) 
Ralston Crawford: Torn Signs was the first exhibition shown in the Vilcek Foundation’s headquarters at 21 East 70th Street, New York, New York. The exhibition features works by American Modernist Ralston Crawford. Ralston Crawford: Torn Signs opened in April 2019, and was on view through November, 2019. A digital exhibition featuring selected works from the exhibition was shared on the Vilcek Foundation website from 2020 – 2021. 

Curated by Emily Schuchardt Navratil, Ralston Crawford: Torn Signs explores the national and international influences on the multifaceted Canadian-born artist. Although he earned acclaim early in his career for his Precisionist paintings of an industrialized America, Crawford devoted the latter part of his career to abstract painting with a remarkable emotional dimension. Ralston Crawford: Torn Signs focuses on two series—“Torn Signs” and “Semana Santa”—that the artist developed over the last two decades of his life.

The Synchromists and Oscar Bluemner's Sonnet Series (2020-2022) 
In early 2020, the Vilcek Foundation launched two concurrent exhibitions in the Vilcek Foundation's headquarters, The Synchromists, and Oscar Bluemner's Sonnet Series.

The Synchromists includes works by Morgan Russell and Stanton Macdonald-Wright, the founders of Synchromism. 

Oscar Bluemner’s Sonnet Series comprises a series of sketches for paintings by Oscar Bluemner based on 12 sonnets by poet Eirene Mungo-Park. 

The exhibitions were displayed at the Vilcek Foundation in the spring of 2020; as a result of the COVID-19 pandemic, the foundation pivoted to launch these exhibitions online on the foundation’s website. Both exhibitions are now part of the Vilcek Foundation's traveling exhibition initiative.

In Summer of 2022 The Synchromists opened at the Thyssen-Bornemisza Museum in Madrid.

Marsden Hartley: Adventurer in the Arts (2021) 
Marsden Hartley: Adventurer in the Arts debuted at the Bates College Museum of Art in Lewiston, Maine in September, 2021. Curated by Emily Schuchardt Navratil, Marsden Hartley: Adventurer in the Arts brings together over 35 paintings and drawings spanning four decades of artwork by American Modernist Marsden Hartley.

To organize this unique exhibition, the Vilcek Foundation partnered with the Bates College Museum of Art, home to the Marsden Hartley Memorial Collection.

The exhibition is accompanied by a full-color catalog from Merrell Publishers.

Earlier events and exhibitions

The Vilcek Foundation's former headquarters, also on the Upper East Side, was the host of exhibitions and events featuring the work of immigrant artists, designers, filmmakers, and others.

Publications

Grounded in Clay: The Spirit of Pueblo Pottery 
Grounded in Clay: The Spirit of Pueblo Pottery accompanies the exhibition of the same name curated by the Pueblo Pottery Collective, and coordinated by the Vilcek Foundation and the School for Advanced Research. 

An impressive survey of more than 100 pieces of historic Pueblo pottery, Grounded in Clay: The Spirit of Pueblo Pottery is remarkable for the fact that the works have been selected by Pueblo community members – the Pueblo Pottery Collective. 

The Pueblo Pottery Collective is made up of more than 60 participants from 21 Pueblo communities in the Southwest – among them potters and other artists, as well as writers, curators and community leaders – along with non-Pueblo stewards of Native American art. These community curators were invited to choose works from the collections of the Indian Arts Research Center at the School for Advanced Research in Santa Fe, New Mexico, and the Vilcek Collection in New York for the exhibition, and to write short essays or contributions on their selections for the catalog. The resulting work centers the voices and lived experiences of Native American people, artists, and community historians. 

In addition to the contributions of the members of the Pueblo Pottery Collective, the catalog features essays by Dr. Joseph Aguilar, Rick Kinsel, Nora Naranjo Morse, and Elysia Poon.

Ralston Crawford: Air + Space + War 
American art underwent a transformation in the period 1940–55, and nowhere is that change better exemplified than in the work of Ralston Crawford (1906–1978).

This exciting book presents a remarkable selection of Crawford’s paintings, drawings, photographs and prints from this pivotal era in the artist’s career. The catalogue, published by Merrell, accompanies the titular exhibition curated by Emily Schuchardt Navratil and organized by the Vilcek Foundation in collaboration with the Brandywine River Museum of Art and the Dayton Art Institute.

Marsden Hartley: Adventurer in the Arts 
Marsden Hartley (1877–1943) was proud to call himself an American artist, but he dreamed of travel to Europe, believing that he would learn more there than in his home state of Maine or even in New York. His rise to prominence as a specifically American modernist was based largely on the visual influences that he encountered in 1912–15 in the vibrant cities of Paris, Berlin, and Munich, which he then synthesized through a New England perspective. Solitary by nature, Hartley never lost his wanderlust, and throughout his life found inspiration in many other landscapes and cultures, including in southern France, Italy, Bermuda, New Mexico, Mexico, and Canada.

Marsden Hartley: Adventurer in the Arts offers a fresh appraisal of this pioneering modernist, whose work continues to be celebrated for its spirituality and experimentation. Rick Kinsel’s introduction provides an overview of the ways Hartley’s peripatetic life shaped his artistic vision. Essays by William Low, Emily Schuchardt Navratil, and Kinsel explore works and artifacts in the Marsden Hartley Memorial Collection of Bates College Museum of Art in Lewiston, Maine.

A Place at the Table: New American Recipes from the Nation's Top Foreign-Born Chefs

A Place at the Table: New American Recipes from the Nation’s Top Foreign-Born Chefs introduces the immigrants who are transforming America’s culinary landscape — chefs who infuse their menus with the flavors of their heritage. It features recipes from 40 of the top foreign-born chefs working in the United States, including Dominique Crenn (France), Michael Solomonov (Israel), Marcus Samuelsson (Ethiopia/Sweden), Corey Lee (South Korea), and Daniela Soto-Innes (Mexico). Stories about the chefs tackling economic injustice and redefining restaurant culture are also told. Food writers included Padma Lakshmi contributed to the cookbook. A Place at the Table was released by Prestel Publishing on September 24, 2019. The cookbook was reviewed in several major media outlets, including Vogue Magazine, BuzzFeed, and New York Magazine. A Place at the Table: New American Recipes from the Nation's Top Foreign-Born Chefs is the recipient of a 2020 Gourmand Award in the category of United States Cuisine.

Ralston Crawford: Torn Signs

Ralston Crawford: Torn Signs explores the national and international influences on the multifaceted Canadian-born artist. Although he earned acclaim early in his career for his Precisionist paintings of an industrialized America, Crawford devoted the latter part of his career to abstract painting with a remarkable emotional dimension. Torn Signs focuses on two series—“Torn Signs” and “Semana Santa”—that the artist developed over the last two decades of his life. The catalogue includes essays from Rick Kinsel on the influence of Crawford’s travels to Europe, especially to Andalusia; William C. Agee on the artist’s life and reaction to historical events of the 20th century; John Crawford on the relationship between the two series and the role of photography in their development; and Emily Schuchardt Navratil on the genesis and context of individual works in each series. "Ralston Crawford: Torn Signs" was released by Merrell Publishers in April 2019.

American Odysseys: Writings by New Americans

American Odysseys is an anthology of twenty-two novelists, poets, and short story writers.  Among the featured writers are Ethiopian-born Dinaw Mengestu, the recipient of the 2011 Vilcek Prize for Creative Promise in Literature; Yugoslavian-born Téa Obreht, the youngest author to receive the Orange Prize in Fiction; and Chinese-born Yiyun Li, a MacArthur Genius grantee.  The foreword is by U.S. Poet Laureate Charles Simic, the winner of the 2011 Vilcek Prize for Literature.  A private, hard copy edition was first published in January 2012, and a trade paperback edition was released by Dalkey Archive Press on May 2, 2013.

Masterpieces of American Modernism: From the Vilcek Collection

Masterpieces of American Modernism: From the Vilcek Collection, features ninety-eight paintings, works on paper and sculptures by twenty artists - including Stuart Davis, Arthur Dove, Marsden Hartley, Georgia O'Keeffe and Max Weber.  William C. Agee contributed the book's introduction and Lewis Kachur wrote individual entries on each work.  In addition to tracing the evolution of individual artists and the movement as a whole, the book explores developments within American Modernism, such as Synchromism and Color Abstraction, American Cubism, and the influence of the landscape and culture of the Southwest (an issue that is explored in depth in the book's Illustrated Timeline). The Collection also highlights the contributions of immigrant artists – eight of the twenty artists were born outside the United States.  The book is prefaced by a collector's statement from Ján Vilček and Marica Vilcek and has contributions by The Vilcek Foundation's President, Rick Kinsel, and Associate Curator, Emily Schuchardt Navratil.

References

Arts foundations based in the United States
Organizations established in 2000
2000 establishments in the United States